Gioia Marconi Braga, daughter of Guglielmo Marconi, was the founder and chairwoman of the Marconi Foundation, now known as the Marconi Society.

Born on April 10, 1916 in London, Braga was a longtime resident of Alpine, New Jersey. Braga died on July 15, 1996.

References

1916 births
1996 deaths
People from Alpine, New Jersey
British people of Italian descent
British emigrants to the United States